The 2012 Six Nations Under 20s Championship was a rugby union competition held between February and March 2012. England won the tournament and the Triple Crown.

Final table

Results

Round one

Round two

Round three

Round four

Round five

References

2012
2012 rugby union tournaments for national teams
2011–12 in English rugby union
2011–12 in French rugby union
2011–12 in Irish rugby union
2011–12 in Welsh rugby union
2011–12 in Scottish rugby union
2011–12 in Italian rugby union
U-20
February 2012 sports events in Europe
March 2012 sports events in Europe